A pentimento is an alteration in a painting evidenced by traces of previous work.

Pentimento may also refer to:
 Pentimento: A Book of Portraits, a 1973 book by American writer Lillian Hellman
 Pentimento Music Company, American independent record label
 Pentimento (album), 2002 debut album by singer Jessica Molaskey
 Pentimento (band), an American punk rock band
 Pentimento (film), a 1989 French comedy film directed and written by Tonie Marshall
 Pentiment (video game), 2022 video game by Obsidian Entertainment